Zella Allen Dixson (August 10, 1858 – January 12, 1924) was an author, lecturer, librarian, and publisher. She was the longest-serving director and associate librarian of the University of Chicago Extension Division's library school.

Early life
Zella Allen was born on August 10, 1858, in Zanesville, Ohio, to Josiah Buffet Allen and Mary Caroline Blandy Allen. In 1880, she graduated from Mount Holyoke College. She married Joseph Ehrman Dixson in 1881 and was soon after widowed in 1885. She began working as an assistant to Melvil Dewey at Columbia College library not long after her husband's death and was one of Dewey's students in library science.

Career
In 1886, Dixson traveled around the Midwest, organizing over thirty libraries including those of Denison University, Kenyon College, and Baptist Union Theological Seminary. She also organized the public libraries of Elyria, Ohio; La Crosse, Wisconsin; and Duluth, Minnesota. That same year, she joined the American Library Association.

From 1888 to 1890, Dixson worked as the librarian of Denison University. From there, she went on to the Baptist Union Theological Seminary. In 1892, the Seminary became the Divinity School at the University of Chicago and Dixson was appointed assistant librarian. While working there, she earned her MA from Shephardson College for Women and would later earn her AM from Denison University in 1902. In 1895, she was promoted to associate librarian. During her career, she made three trips to Europe to study the handling of rare books.

Dixson went on to become the associate librarian, instructor, and director of the library school at the University of Chicago Extension Division—a program originally designed to teach the public how to use libraries. University President William Rainey Harper had initially asked Melvil Dewey to take the position, but Dewey turned it down. By 1900, Dixson had expanded the library school into a program that provided professional training for librarians.

Feud with Melvil Dewey and Katharine Sharp
In 1900, Melvil Dewey wrote a letter to the president of the University of Chicago, William Rainey Harper, stating that Dixson was incompetent as a librarian and as the program director of the library school. He also accused her of falsely claiming to be a graduate of the New York State Library School. Dixson responded by stating that she never claimed to have attended New York State Library School and that Dewey was only criticizing her work with the Extension Division because of the competition her program created with Katharine Sharp's library school at the University of Illinois in Urbana. She pointed out the many esteemed library positions held by her program's graduates, and also defended herself by presenting copies of letters and addresses Dewey wrote in which he praised Dixson as one of his best students. Dixson concluded her letter to Harper by stating: 
The students, graduates, and employers of those who were enrolled in the Extension Division's library school also wrote to Harper defending both the program and Dixson's competence. University library cataloger and instructor Josephine Robertson even stated her belief that Dewey was bitter over Dixson's creation and use of a different classification system than the one he devised.

In 1902, Harper received a letter from the ALA's College and Reference Library Section criticizing the Extension Division's program and Dixson. Dixson responded by stating that each of their criticisms was false and accused Katharine Sharp and Melvil Dewey, who was a member of the ALA's College Section, of conspiring against her library school. She also warned Harper that, if he decided to close down the school, it would cost the university thousands of dollars in returned tuition and cause the library to lose its student workers.

In July 1903, the ALA's Committee on Library Training, of which Katharine Sharp was a member, released a report on the Extension Division's school, criticizing it for not having stricter admissions requirements and for not requiring students to complete the full program before receiving a certificate. In October of that year, the library school was shut down with much protest from the students and the faculty.

Later life
After the library school at the University of Chicago Extension Division closed, Dixson remained as the university's associate librarian. In 1906, she was given an honorary Doctorate of Humane Letters by Shurtleff College, which is now part of Southern Illinois University. She retired from the University of Chicago in 1910 to spend more time working on her literary projects and the Wisteria Cottage Press, which she owned and operated. She remained active in the Chicago Woman's Club and the Chicago Political Equality League through 1914. Dixson died on January 12, 1924, in Chicago.

Professional associations & clubs
Dixson joined the American Library Association, the Illinois Library Association, and the Chicago Library Club in 1886. She was a member of the Chicago Woman's Club and president of the Mt. Holyoke Association of the Northwest as well as a member of the Chicago Political Equality League, the Travelers' Club, and the Authors League of America. In 1893, she was appointed to the Woman's Advisory Council on a Congress of Librarians and was a member of both the Advisory Council of the Woman's Branch of the Worlds' Congress Auxiliary and the Committee on Literature Sub-Congress on Libraries.

Dixson belonged to several clubs in Europe as well, most of them focusing on bookplates (also known as "ex-libris"). She was a member of the Ex Libris Society of London, Exlibris Verein zu Berlin (Ex-Libris Association of Berlin), Österreichische Ex-Libris-Gesellschaft (Austrian Ex-Libris Society) in Vienna, Société Française des Collectionneurs d'Ex-Libris (French Society of Ex-Libris Collectors) in Paris, and the Ex-Libris Club in Basle.

Published works
In 1894, Dixson's work Library Science was published. Her works Cataloger's Manual of Authors' Names and Comprehensive Subject Index to Universal Prose Fiction were published in 1895 and 1896 respectively.
Dixson was also an avid collector of bookplates and, in 1902, published a collection called Children's book-plates. She followed it up in 1903 with Concerning book-plates: a handbook for collectors.

See also
 University of Chicago Extension Division Library School
 Library science
 Illinois Library Association
 American Library Association
 Melvil Dewey
 Katharine Sharp
 William Rainey Harper

References

Notes

Bibliography
 Directory and Register of Women's Clubs: City of Chicago and Vicinity. Chicago: Linden Brothers & Harry H. De Clerque, 1914.
 "Dixson, Zella Allen" entry pg. 2025 in Twentieth century biographical dictionary of notable Americans. vol.2 ed. by Rossiter Johnson, Ph.D., LL.D. Boston: The Biographical Society, 1904.
 Dixson, Zella Allen. Comprehensive Subject Index to Universal Prose Fiction. New York: Dodd, Mead and Company, 1897.
 Dixson, Zella Allen. Papers (1876-1910). Special Collections Research Center, University of Chicago.
 Harper, W.R. Correspondence (1900-1903). (Series 1, Box 26, Folder 8). Office of the President.
 International Dictionary of Library Histories. ed. by David H. Stam. New York: Routledge, 2001.
 Moore, E.L. "Illinois Library Association." Library Journal 22 (1897): 28-29.
 "Mrs. J.E. Dixson." Denison Collegian (October 6, 1888): no page number.
 Stauffer, Suzanne M. "'Mr. Dewey Is Crazy and Katharine Sharp Hates the University of Chicago:' Gender, Power, and Personality and the Demise of the University of Chicago Course in Library Science 1897-1903." Journal of Education for Library and Information Science 56, no. 2 (Spring 2015): 101-113.
 "Twenty-five years of library service." Public Libraries 15 (1910): 211.
 Who was who in America: a companion biographical reference work to Who's who in America. (1960). Vol. 3. Chicago: Marquis Who's Who.
 Woman's Who's Who of America: A Biographical Dictionary of Contemporary Women of the United States and Canada ed. by John William Leonard. New York: The American Commonwealth Company, 1914. pg. 249.
 "Zella A. Dixon" [sic]. Chicago News-Record (February 20, 1893), no page number.

Further reading
 Dixson, Zella Allen. Blurb in "Recent Theological Literature." The American Journal of Theology 2 (October 1, 1898): 941.
 Dixson, Zella Allen. Comprehensive Subject Index to Universal Prose Fiction. New York: Dodd, Mead and Company, 1897.
 Dixson, Zella Allen. Concerning book-plates: a handbook for collectors. Chicago: Wisteria Cottage Press, 1903.
 "Guide to the Zella Allen Dixson Papers 1876-1910," University of Chicago Library (2006).
 University College. (1901). Special circular No. 1. Library science: courses of instruction 1900-1901. Chicago: University of Chicago Press.
 "University Extension Division." University of Chicago. Course in library economy. Chicago: University of Chicago, 1866.
 "University of Chicago." Annual register of the University of Chicago. Chicago: University of Chicago Press, 1918.
 "University of Chicago library classes."  Library Journal 22 (1897): 22.

External links
 Zella Allen Dixson collection in University of Chicago Photographic Archive
 Illustrated Catalogue and Classified Book List of the Northwestern Library Association. Chicago: Northwestern Library Association, September 1899. (Partly compiled and edited by Zella Allen Dixson)
 Illinois Library Association
 Guide to the Zella Allen Dixson Papers 1876-1910 at the University of Chicago Special Collections Research Center

1858 births
1924 deaths
American librarians
American women librarians
Mount Holyoke College alumni
Denison University alumni
University of Chicago people
People from Zanesville, Ohio